Virtual Bart is a video game developed by Sculptured Software and published by Acclaim Entertainment. It was released for the Super NES and Genesis in 1994. It is a game based on the American animated television series The Simpsons and features Bart Simpson and other Simpsons characters.

The official guide to the game (Virtual Bart Official Game Secrets, Prima Publishing, 1995; re-published by the author, 2019) was written by Steve Schwartz. Although originally slated to be a guide to all Simpsons games, it took over a year to obtain the necessary permissions, limiting its coverage to only Virtual Bart.

Gameplay 

Virtual Bart consists of several minigames, similar to Bart's Nightmare. Unlike Bart's Nightmare, the game does not feature a hub world and each stage is selected randomly using a spinning roulette wheel. Gameplay for Dino Bart, Baby Bart, and Pig Bart consists of platforming, while Class Picture, Mount Splashmore, and Doomsday Bart consist of different play styles.

All stages feature a time limit. If the time runs out, the player loses a life. Additionally, all stages except for Class Picture feature a health bar, which decreases every time Bart gets hit. Several stages feature corn dogs that restore Bart's health, as well as extra lives.

Once a stage is completed, it cannot be repeated; if the wheel lands on an already-completed stage, it will continue spinning slowly to the nearest remaining stage panel. If the wheel lands on the skull or corn dog panel (which quickly alternates between showing each item), the player will lose or gain a life, respectively.

If the player fails a stage, they lose one life and are taken back to the roulette wheel. Failure when the player has no extra lives prematurely ends the game. Otherwise, the game ends after all stages are cleared.

The game consists of six different stages:

 Dino Bart: Bart is a dinosaur and runs across a primitive Springfield, and rampages throughout mountains while defeating several primitive humans that resemble Simpsons characters. Bart attacks with his tail and can roar, defeating all enemies on screen after picking up certain items. If the stage is completed, a prehistoric Homer is seen frozen in a present-day museum.
 Baby Bart: A baby Bart follows a moving ice cream truck by escaping his home and swings his way out of his home, ending up in his local street way, and eventually a circus. Bart can use his diaper as a parachute to slow his fall while airborne, and can use his pacifier as a projectile. If the stage is completed, Bart enters the ice cream truck, with a younger Homer chasing him.
 Pig Bart: Bart is a pig who has been captured and taken to Krusty's Pork Factory, but manages to escape, and sets off to free the captured pigs. Bart can only walk and jump, and must switch levers to free captured pigs. If the stage is completed, the pigs escape and Bart is hailed as a hero by the pigs.
 Class Picture: Bart intends to ruin his school's Picture Day shooting by throwing tomatoes at all of his classmates. After he succeeds, the school schedules a reshoot, which Bart intends to ruin by throwing eggs at his classmates. Bart must throw tomatoes and eggs at his classmates in a 3D field. Bart has a limited number of projectiles, and if he runs out of tomatoes or eggs, or if any adult characters are hit, the player fails the stage. There are 2 rounds. If Bart succeeds, Bart will be the only student not to have been splatted in the photo shoot.
 Mount Splashmore: Bart enters the Mount Splashmore water slide and must make it down safely. The stage is played from a forward-facing view, centered behind Bart. Bart must avoid obstacles and make it down to the end of the slide before time runs out. There are several forks in the slide's path. Choosing the wrong path either leads to a stuck Homer, which wastes time and sends Bart back up to the fork; or to an early exit that instantly kills him. Several power-ups appear, such as a clock that adds extra time and a surfboard that grants temporary invulnerability. If Bart manages to reach the end, he will exit the slide, splashing Sherri and Terri.
 Doomsday Bart: An explosion at the Springfield Nuclear Power Plant causes Springfield to become an apocalyptic wasteland. Bart must make his way to the Springfield entrance on his motorcycle while avoiding Jimbo and Kearney. The level plays in a 3D view, where Bart drives along a road while avoiding the two bullies' attacks. Bart can attack and can speed up his motorcycle. Passing a checkpoint extends time. If the stage is completed, Bart makes it to his house in time to watch The Krusty the Clown Show.

Plot 
At a science fair, Martin Prince presents a virtual reality device that displays six educational exhibitions. However, Bart causes the device to malfunction and gets trapped in it. Bart must complete the six programs to escape the machine.

If Bart successfully completes every stage, he escapes from the device. Homer then enters the malfunctioning device, which explodes shortly thereafter. If the player gets a Game Over, the system "hangs" and the real Bart is trapped inside the device.

Reception 

Electronic Gaming Monthly scored the Super NES version a 4.8 out of 10, commenting that "The control is awful (like on the dinosaur stage), the stages unappealing, and the whole thing seems rushed."

Reviewing the Genesis port, GamePro praised it as being "[virtually] identical" to the SNES original. They commented of the game itself that "The humorous variations on Bart, different game play (including behind-the-Bart racing and a shooter level), and cameos of Simpsons nitwits all combine to keep the action intriguing and funny."

References 

1994 video games
Acclaim Entertainment games
Sega Genesis games
Super Nintendo Entertainment System games
Video games about children
Video games based on The Simpsons
Video games about video games
Video games about virtual reality
Video games scored by Sam Powell
Video games set in the United States
Video games developed in the United States
Single-player video games